Afonso de Albuquerque Maranhão (died 10 July 1836) was a politician of the Empire of Brazil. He served as governor of the states of Pernambuco and Paraiba. From 1826 until his death, he was a member of the Senate of the Empire of Brazil.

References

18th-century births
1836 deaths
Governors of Pernambuco (Empire of Brazil)
Governors of Paraíba (Empire of Brazil)
Year of birth unknown
Place of birth unknown
Members of the Senate of the Empire of Brazil